Ella Cinders is an American syndicated comic strip created by writer Bill Conselman and artist Charles Plumb. Distributed for most of its run by United Feature Syndicate, the daily version was launched June 1, 1925, and a Sunday page followed two years later. It was discontinued on December 2, 1961. Chris Crusty ran above Ella Cinders as a topper strip from July 5, 1931 to July 6, 1941.

Publication history 
Ella Cinders was launched in 1925 by the Metropolitan Newspaper Service (MNS). In the summer of 1925, Max Elser, Jr., the president of MNS, introduced Ella Cinders and Conselman to the readers of Cartoons & Movies magazine:

United Features acquired MNS in 1930, taking over syndication of Ella Cinders.

The credited artists on the strip were creator Charles Plumb (June 1, 1925 - May 13, 1950), Fred Fox (May 15, 1950 - 1960) and Roger Armstrong of Scamp (1960 - December 2, 1961).

However, the comic strip had numerous ghost writers and ghost artists. Comic strip historian Allan Holtz notes, "Very seldom did the credited writer or artist perform the task claimed - though they were usually involved in some capacity." The ghosts included children's book author Hardie Gramatky, Morton Traylor, Henry Formhals (of Freckles and His Friends) and Texas artist Jack W. McGuire. His son, Jack W. McGuire, Jr., recalled:
 His first strip was Jane Arden in 1934, followed by Bullet Benton, a cowboy boxer similar to Joe Palooka; then the Red Knight. After the Red Knight in 1943, Dad began drawing Ella Cinders as a ghost artist for the original artist, Charles Plumb. He drew this strip until he died in December 1945.

Characters and story
Initially, as the name implies, the strip presented a variation on the classic Cinderella story, but then it diverged into other plotlines, as noted by comics historian Don Markstein:

Film adaptation
The prolific Alfred E. Green directed the film adaptation Ella Cinders, starring Colleen Moore, produced by Moore's husband John McCormick, and released by First National Pictures on June 6, 1926.

In the house of her late father, Ella Cinders (Moore) works for her stepmother and two stepsisters, Prissy Pill (Emily Gerdes) and Lotta Pill (Doris Baker), finding support from the local iceman, Waite Lifter (Lloyd Hughes). The Gem Film Company has a contest in which the winner gets an all-expense-paid trip to Hollywood and a movie role.

A photograph is needed to enter, so Ella spends three nights babysitting to raise $3 for the photo session. However, the photographer unwittingly take a picture of her looking cross-eyed at a fly on her nose which turns out to be the photo entered in the contest. Entrants must go to a Town Hall ball, but Ella's stepmother and stepsisters won't allow her to go. Waite sees her crying on the front steps and tells her he will take her to the ball. She says she has nothing to wear, so he convinces her to use one of her stepsisters' dresses. At the judges' table, her stepsisters react violently when they see the dress. The embarrassed Ella flees the ball, losing one of her slippers.

Later, the judges come to the house and tell Ella that she is the winner because they were amused by the cross-eyed photo. Ella heads for Hollywood, where she is disappointed to discover the contest was a fraud. She nevertheless manages to land a movie contract. Waite turns out to be wealthy football hero George Waite, and the two are reunited.

Books
Ella also turned up in Big Little Books and comic books, including early issues of Tip Top and Sparkler Comics, plus her own title in 1948–1949.

References

1925 comics debuts
1961 comics endings
Adventure comics
American comics adapted into films
Cinders, Ella
American comic strips
Cinderella
Comics about women
Drama comics
Cinders, Ella